Rhynchopsilopa is a genus of shore-flies (Ephydridae). The adults feed on the gut contents of ants. They use their antennae to locate ant nests and use their long sclerotized proboscis to puncture the abdomen of ant workers and feed on the gut contents without killing their victims. They also take honey in laboratory conditions and may not be obligate associates of ants. Their larvae are unknown. Species in the genus are found in Africa and Asia.

The genus is placed in the tribe Psilopini within which they are distinct in having long pendant antennae, a long proboscis, a short forehead, a concave face, and a convex abdomen. After locating an ant, they run after it rather than fly. They jab and obtain gut contents from the ant abdomen very rapidly.

About 18 species have been described:

 Rhynchopsilopa albipunctata  (South Africa, Angola)
 Rhynchopsilopa apicallis  (Nigeria)
 Rhynchopsilopa ceylonensis  (Sri Lanka)
 Rhynchopsilopa coei  (Nepal, China)
 Rhynchopsilopa frontalis  (Nepal)
 Rhynchopsilopa fuscipennis  (Nigeria)
 Rhynchopsilopa guangdongensis  (China)
 Rhynchopsilopa huangkengensis  (China)
 Rhynchopsilopa jinxiuensis  (China)
 Rhynchopsilopa laevigata  (Zimbabwe)
 Rhynchopsilopa magnicornis  (Thailand, Malaya)
 Rhynchopsilopa minor  (Mozambique)
 Rhynchopsilopa nitidissima  (Egypt) [shown to prefer ants in the genus Crematogaster]
 Rhynchopsilopa pallipes  (Republic of Congo)
 Rhynchopsilopa philippinensis  (Philippines)
 Rhynchopsilopa shixingensis  (China)
 Rhynchopsilopa struckenbergi  (Mozambique, Zimbabwe)
 Rhynchopsilopa trautae  (Tanzania)

References

External links 

 http://species-id.net/wiki/Rhynchopsilopa

Brachycera genera
Ephydridae